Lucky Devils (Swedish: Lyckans gullgossar) is a 1932 Swedish comedy film directed by Ivar Johansson and Sigurd Wallén and starring Wallén, Erik Berglund, Maritta Marke and Tutta Rolf. It was shot at the Råsunda Studios in Stockholm. The film's sets were designed by the art director Arne Åkermark.

Synopsis
Two men encounter extreme good fortune when they find a lucky horseshoe in a Stockholm street.

Cast
 Sigurd Wallén as 	Carl Erik Jansson / Carl Erik Silverberg
 Erik Berglund as 	Hugo Lundström / Hugo Guldén 
 Maritta Marke as 	Lola del Prado
 Tutta Rolf as 	Dolores del Prado 
 Eric Laurent as  Richard Gordon
 Ragnar Widestedt as 	Herman Högmark
 Thor Modéen as 	Accountant with Cheeses
 Carl-Gunnar Wingård as 	Karl Hampus Blondin
 Jullan Jonsson as 	Tjohanna
 Helge Andersson as 	Decorator 
 Tor Borong as 	Man in audience 
 Göran Bratt as 	Boy 
 Alice Carlsson as 	Girl at the ball 
 Artur Cederborgh as 	Argentin 
 Carl Deurell as 	Carl Gustaf Ekman 
 Bertil Ehrenmark as 	Construction worker 
 Georg Enders as 	Piano player 
 Gösta Ericsson as Representative 
 Sigge Fürst as 	Dinner guest 
 Karl Gerhard as 	Tennis player 
 Bengt-Olof Granberg as 	Dancer 
 Karin Granberg as 	Dinner guest 
 Wictor Hagman as 	Waitor 
 Wilhelm Haqvinius as 	Customer in the barber shop 
 Gunnar Johansson as 	Piano player 
 Helge Kihlberg as 	Man in audience  
 Olof Krook as Construction worker 
 Herman Lantz as 	Worker 
 Richard Lindström as 	Dr. Walther Müller 
 Vera Nilsson as 	Daisy Korall 
 Yngve Nyqvist as 	Alexei Slavoninsky 
 Robert Ryberg as 	Dr. Fritz König 
 Georg Skarstedt as Clerk

References

Bibliography 
 Qvist, Per Olov & von Bagh, Peter. Guide to the Cinema of Sweden and Finland. Greenwood Publishing Group, 2000.

External links 
 

1932 films
Swedish comedy films
1932 comedy films
1930s Swedish-language films
Films directed by Ivar Johansson
Films directed by Sigurd Wallén
Swedish black-and-white films
Films set in Stockholm
Films shot in Stockholm
1930s Swedish films